Hotel Alexandra may refer to:

 Hotel Alexandra (Boston), built in 1875
 Hotel Alexandra (Loen), built in 1884

See also 
 Hotel Alexandria
 Royal Alexandra Hotel, a Canadian Pacific Hotel built in 1906